Nemo Vista High School is a comprehensive four-year public high school in Center Ridge, Arkansas, United States. It is one of four public high schools located in Conway County and is the sole high school administered by Nemo Vista School District serving grades 9 through 12.

Academics 
The assumed course of study follows the Smart Core curriculum developed by the Arkansas Department of Education (ADE), which requires students to complete at least 22 units prior to graduation. Students complete regular (core and career focus) classes and exams and may select Advanced Placement (AP) coursework and exams that may result in college credit.  Nemo Vista High School is accredited by the ADE.

Nemo Vista is a member of the Arch Ford Education Service Cooperative, which provides career and technical education programs.

Athletics 
The Nemo Vista mascot and athletic emblem is the Redhawk with red and white serving as its school colors.

The Nemo Vista Redhawks compete in the state's smallest classification—1A Classification administered by the Arkansas Activities Association. For 2012–14, Nemo Vista competes in the 1A Region 5 North Conference. The Redhawks provide teams in volleyball, golf (boys/girls), basketball (boys/girls), baseball, softball, and track and field (boys/girls).

 Boys Basketball: 2 State Championships- 1944,1975
 Girls Basketball: 3 State Championships- 2014,2015,2016
 Softball: 2 State Championships- 2008,2011
Baseball:1 State Championship- 1996

References

External links

Public high schools in Arkansas
Schools in Conway County, Arkansas